Massala obvertens, the tropical massala moth, is a species of moth in the family Erebidae. It is found in North America.

The MONA or Hodges number for Massala obvertens is 8586.

References

Further reading

 
 
 

Eulepidotinae
Articles created by Qbugbot
Moths described in 1858